Lars Vilandt (born 22 August 1974) is a Danish curler from Hvidovre.

He made his world championship debut at the 2001 Lausanne World Championships with a team skippered by Johnny Frederiksen. At the 2009 Moncton World Championships his team placed fifth with a 5–6 record. These three results would be good enough to qualify a team to the 2010 Winter Olympics in Vancouver, British Columbia, Canada.

Teammates 
2010 Vancouver Olympic Games

Johnny Frederiksen, Fourth

Ulrik Schmidt, Skip

Bo Jensen, Lead

Teammates 
2014 	Sochi Olympic Games

Rasmus Stjerne, Skip

Johnny Frederiksen, third

Mikkel Poulsen, Second

Troels Harry, Lead

James Dryburgh, Coach

References 
WCT profile
Curlit.com profile
WCF profile

Living people
Olympic curlers of Denmark
Curlers at the 2010 Winter Olympics
Curlers at the 2014 Winter Olympics
Danish male curlers
1974 births
Place of birth missing (living people)
People from Rødovre
Sportspeople from the Capital Region of Denmark
21st-century Danish people